Casiano Tejeda (born 13 October 1971) is a Bolivian weightlifter. He competed in the men's middle heavyweight event at the 1992 Summer Olympics.

References

1971 births
Living people
Bolivian male weightlifters
Olympic weightlifters of Bolivia
Weightlifters at the 1992 Summer Olympics
Place of birth missing (living people)